The Novyi LEF or New LEF journal (The New Left Front of the Arts) was a literary-critical periodical published by the State Publishing House “Gosizdat” in 1927-28 in Moscow, RFSFR. Futurist poet Vladimir Mayakovsky served as editor-in-chief, with Sergei Tretyakov replacing him in August 1928. Under both editors, a single issue totaled between 40-50 pages. Novyi LEF was a 22-issue revival of the original LEF journal (The Left Front of the Arts), which was published in seven issues in 1923-25. Both LEF and Novyi LEF emerged from the LEF literary group, composed of Futurist and Formalist writers, theorists, and artists committed to a revolutionary transformation of Soviet culture. Novyi LEF consistently showcased photography (often by the constructivist Alexander Rodchenko, who also designed many of the journal’s covers), literary theory and criticism, poetry, editorials, and occasionally creative prose.

Ideology 
Novyi LEF included a variety of members of the Soviet literary and artistic avant-garde, as well as critics and academicians. In 1922, Mayakovsky offered a definition of LEF: “encompassing of the social theme by all the instruments of futurism” – this emphasis on avant-garde methods in the service of Soviet social necessity continued to define Novyi LEF’s orientation five years later. Novyi LEF rejected aesthetics or belletrism as well as traditional methods of realist representation in favor of production-oriented constructivism. The journal’s contributors often polemicized against competing literary groups, including RAPP (The Russian Association of Proletarian Writers) and Pereval (“Mountain Pass”).
Mayakovsky’s programmatic editorial statement in the inaugural January 1927 issue reflected on the challenges facing Soviet cultural life. Reviving the LEF periodical as Novyi LEF was a necessity, for according to Mayakovsky, Soviet culture after the New Economic Policy (NEP) was stuck in a “swamp.” Multiple years of NEP “philistinism” had led to cultural degeneration. Mayakovsky and his affiliates argued that a return to factography and zhiznestroenie – two key planks in the Novyi LEF platform – would rejuvenate a truly revolutionary workers’ literary and cultural production.

Literature of Fact 
The LEF emphasis on factual reporting heralded a return to the unvarnished objective world versus manufactured artistic unity. The material of life itself would generate artistic forms suitable for contemporaneity’s expression. The newspaper and attendant journalistic genres (e.g. reportage, sketches, travel accounts) were lauded: Novyi LEF contributors regarded the newspaper medium as being conducive to a fact-oriented marriage between the literary and journalistic spheres, one that would be sensitive to the social necessities generated by Soviet modernity. Writing in 1929, Tretyakov maintained: “Our epos is the newspaper…What the Bible was to the medieval Christian – a pointer for all the contingencies of life; what the moralizing novel was to the Russian liberal intelligentsia, that is the newspaper for the Soviet activist of our times."

LEF contributors would sometimes publish their literary and critical projects in their intermediate stages – for instance, Viktor Shklovsky’s study of Lev Tolstoy’s novel, War and Peace, published in Novyi LEF No. 10, 1927, bore the parenthetical subtitle “Plan issledovaniia” (“Research Plan”). Shklovsky’s study would later be serialized in multiple issues in 1928. Mayakovsky discusses his pre-writing for a screen play entitled “Kak pozhivaete?” (“How Do You Do?”) in a question-and-answer format, while also publishing a portion of his storyboard skeleton of the film’s plot. By exposing research and creative processes, Novyi LEF attempted to demystify the process of artistic production and thereby began to initiate the reader into the ranks of cultural producers.

The Role of Poetry 
Agitational poetry continued to be given pride of place under Mayakovsky’s editorship. Leading Soviet poets including Mayakovsky himself and Nikolai Aseev, as well as the futurist poets Semyon Kirsanov and Petr Neznamov, all published rhetorical verse oriented toward contemporary life in Novyi LEF. Their poetic contributions included “Literaturnyi fel’eton” ("Literary Feuilleton", Aseev), “Puteshestvie po Moskve” ("Travels Around Moscow", Neznamov), “Moia imeninnaia: Poema” ("My Name's Day: A Narrative Poem", Kirsanov), and “Oktiabr’” ("October", Mayakovsky).

Interactions between the journal’s readers and its editors/contributors were publicized in the journal’s pages. One particular form of reader-editor interaction occurred frequently in the first few issues in 1928: beginning poets eager for feedback on their verse would submit their poems accompanied with a note asking for an evaluation of their poetry. Novyi LEF poets and critics – including Aseev, Mayakovsky, and Vladimir Trenin – in about a half-dozen instances in the 1927-28 print run, published the aspiring poet’s introductory note, their verse, as well as comments and remarks that indicated the correspondent’s strengths and weaknesses as a poet.

Changes in Editorial Vision 
After editorial disagreements between Mayakovsky and Tretyakov, Tretyakov took over as chief editor in August 1928; he initiated a pivot away from poetry toward the supposedly more “progressive” genre of prose. (In the September 1928 issue, Igor Terent’iev critically summarizes Mayakovsky’s reasons for abandoning the Novyi LEF journal and the LEF movement overall). Mayakovsky’s abdication from the editorship of Novyi LEF triggered an exodus among long-standing contributors. After July 1928, Aseev, Osip Brik, and poet Aleksei Khruchyonykh never again published in the journal’s pages.

The final five issues of Novyi LEF display a marked increase in the number of essays and critical prose, with a conspicuous absence of poetry. It was in issues No. 10 and 11 that literary critic Nikolai Chuzhak developed at considerable length his theory of “zhiznestroenie” (in effect, factographic literature as “life building”).

Mayakovsky went on to form the short-lived REF group (Revolutionary Front of the Arts) in 1929 along with Brik, Aseev, and Rodchenko. He subsequently joined RAPP in 1930, before his suicide in April of that year.

Novyi LEF in America 
The eventual founding director of the Museum of Modern Art (MoMA) in New York City, Alfred H. Barr Jr., became acquainted with multiple members of the LEF group during his visit to Moscow in 1928. Barr’s letters and journal diary attest to his veneration of the LEF members' creative energies and vision. He maintained that the future of artistic development belonged to Russia – “Russia has at least a century of greatness before her, […] she will wax while France and England wane.” The MoMA has digitized Rodchenko’s Novyi LEF cover artworks, which were displayed in the 2012-2013 exhibition, “The Shaping of New Visions: Photography, Film, Photobook.”

Contributors 
 
Viktor Shklovsky
Vladimir Trenin
Vladimir Mayakovsky
Sergei Avratov
Osip Brik
Nikolai Aseev
Nikolai Chuzhak
Alexander Rodchenko
Sergei Tretyakov
Viktor Pertsov
Petr Neznamov
Vitalii Zhemchuzhnyi
Igor Terent’ev
Semyon Kirsanov

See also 
 LEF (journal)

References

External links
 Digitized issues of Novyi LEF, with plaintext

Bibliography 
 Brown, Edward J. “Lef (Levyi front iskusstva – Left Front of Art), and Novyi Lef.” Handbook of Russian Literature. Ed. Victor Terras. New Haven: Yale University Press, 1985: 244.
 Kornienko, Natalia. “Literary Criticism and Cultural Policy During the New Economic Policy, 1921-1927.” A History of Russian Literary Theory and Criticism: The Soviet Age and Beyond. Ed. Evgeny Dobrenko and Galin Tihanov. Pittsburg: University of Pittsburgh Press, 2011: 17-42.
 Shvetsova, L.K. “’Lef’ [zhurnal].” Kratkaia literaturnaia entsiklopediia. Red. A.A. Surkov. Moskva: T. 4, 1967: 172. http://feb-web.ru/feb/kle/kle-abc/ke4/ke4-1721.htm?cmd=p&istext=1 Retrieved 2021-05-01.
 Stephan, Halina. “Left Art.” Handbook of Russian Literature. Ed. Victor Terras. New Haven: Yale University Press, 1985: 244.
 Svatukhina, E.N. “Zhurnal ‘Novyi Lef’ kak istoricheskii istochnik dlia izucheniia deiatel’nosti ob’edineniia ‘Levyi front iskusstv.” Kul’tura. Dukhovnost’. Obshchestvo. 1, 2012: 62-70.
 Zagorets, Iaroslav. “Iz istorii vzaimootnoshenii ‘Lefa’ i ‘Novogo Lefa.’” Vestnik Tambovskogo universiteta. Seriia: Gumanitarnye nauki. 2010: 127-132.

1927 establishments in Russia
1928 disestablishments in Russia